Robert Caldwell (1814–1891) was a British missionary and linguist.

Robert Caldwell may also refer to:

 Robert Caldwell (academic) (1843–1914), Master of Corpus Christi College, Cambridge
 Robert Porter Caldwell (1821–1885), American representative from Tennessee
 Robert Caldwell (Australian politician) (1843–1909), South Australian politician
 Robert Caldwell (Wisconsin politician) (1866–1950), American farmer, businessman, and politician
 Robert Caldwell (footballer) (born 1909), English footballer
 Robert R. Caldwell, American theoretical physicist
 Bobby Caldwell (1951–2023), American musician
 Bobby Caldwell (drummer), American drummer
 Dr. Robert Caldwell, a character on St. Elsewhere portrayed by Mark Harmon